Koksara is one of the Town in Dharamgarh sub-division in Kalahandi District in Odisha State. This town and Gram Panchayat comes under Kokasara Tehsil in Kalahandi District. Kokasara is 57 km distance from its District Main City Bhawanipatna and 484 km distance from its State Main City Bhubaneswar. Smt Sabyarani Bag is the Chairperson  of Koksara Block, Sri Tribhuban Naik is the PS member from Koksara GP and Sri Kishor Chandra Pradhani is the Sarapanch of Koksara Gram Panchyat.

Demographics
According to census 2001, Total Population of Koksara was 4,255, where it constitutes  2,131 of male and 2,124 of female population. Koksara had a total literacy population of 2,266, from which male literacy population was 1,435(63%) and female literacy population was 8,31(37%).The town had total sc population of 871 and total st population of 514. Whereas workers population was 1736, Cultivators population was 404 and non workers population was 2519 of the town according to census. The town had a balanced sex ratio as it led female per 1000 male was 997. The percentage of worker to population was 42%.

Education
Schools nearby Koksara

P U P School, Majursahi
Saraswati Sishu Mandir, Ladugaon
Colleges nearby Koksara

Priyadarshini Indira Mahavidyalaya, Junagarh
Chandrika Jain Degree College, Borda
Ladugaon Higher Secondary School, Ladugaon
Panchayat Samiti Degree College, Koksara
Panchayat samiti junior +2 college, koksara
L.A. +2 Junior College, Behera

Nearby Tourist Places

 Indravati Dam

Indravati or Upper Indravati Hydro Power Project is one of the largest Dam in India as well as Asia. It is the largest dam in eastern India which produces 600MW of electricity. The Upper Indravati Project envisages diversion of water, of the indravati river in its upper reaches into the Mahanadi valley for power generation and irrigation.
 
The project would involve construction of 4 dams across the Indravati and its tributaries 8 dykes and two inter-linking channels to form a single reservoir with a live capacity of 1435.5 Mcum, 4.32 km. tunnel, a power house with installation of 4 units of 150 MW each turbines, 9 km. tail race channel and an irrigation barrage across Hati river with the associated irrigation canals i.e., Left Canal and Right Canal.

Irrigation from left canal is done in Kalampur, Koksara, Junagarh and Dharmagarh Block where Asia's longest aqueduct is made on Tel River near Odisha border. And right canal is done is Junagarh (Nandol area) and Bhawanipatna Block, the construction work is under process in Karlapada block where it merges with Ret River. The water comes from mainly Indravati River, Pet fula Naal etc.

Hospitals nearby 
Sub-Divisional Headquarters Hospital, Dharamgarh
Sardar Raja Medical College, Jaring Bhawanipatna
District Headquarters Hospital, Bhawanipatna
Life Worth Hospital, Bhawanipatna

How to reach Koksara

AirPorts Nearby Koksara
Raipur Airport 321 km near.

Railway Stations (Connecting Koksara)

Junagarh: 35 km
Bhawanipatna: 57 km
Kesinga: 92 km

Notes-Major Nearby Railway Station that connects to Maximum Number of Main stations in India.

References

External links
Odishashampad

Cities and towns in Kalahandi district